Commonwealth Youth New Zealand is a youth-led nonprofit that educates young New Zealanders about the Commonwealth and the values of the Charter of the Commonwealth. It provides opportunities for young people to develop their leadership skills in an international context by hosting national and regional events for secondary students.

Events

National Student Commonwealth Heads of Government Meeting 
Students are appointed as a head of government or foreign minister of a Commonwealth member state, or a special envoy from an observer organisation and participate in a simulation of a Commonwealth Heads of Government Meeting. Delegations usually consist of two students from each participating school. They debate a host of topics, from human rights to climate change, bringing the perspective of the government they represent.

Delegates also participate in a model Commonwealth Ministerial Action Group scenario, where they are tasked with resolving a burgeoning conflict or crisis situation involving member states.

Secretary-General 
Delegates can also put their names forward to be considered for the role of National Student Commonwealth Heads of Government Meeting Secretary-General. The successful applicant will, as the real Secretary-General of the Commonwealth does, chair all the conference plenary sessions, encourage delegates to form resolutions on the points of debate, and present an opening and closing address to assembled delegations, invited guests, and Commonwealth High Commissioners accredited to New Zealand. The Commonwealth Secretary-General is responsible to all heads of government and plays a key role in the direction of the Student Commonwealth Heads of Government Meeting and agenda issues.

Media delegation 
The Student Commonwealth Heads of Government Meeting press corps represents the role the media play at international conferences. They conduct interviews and press conferences with country delegates and produce written and cinematic content about the Student Commonwealth Heads of Government Meeting proceedings.

Common Leaders' Day 
 
Common Leaders' Day is a one-day leadership development programme for senior high school students. Participants are immersed in a range of workshops aimed at equipping them with practical skills they can use to define their personal leadership styles. They learn about the importance and purpose of the Commonwealth and its values in an ever-changing world.

Structure

Executive Committee 
The executive committee manages Commonwealth Youth New Zealand's operations, including delivering its events and educational programmes. Members are appointed by the board. The chair of the committee is currently Kaya Selby.

Board 
Commonwealth Youth New Zealand's board provides governs the organisation and provides mentoring and strategic direction to the executive committee. Board members are elected by the membership at annual general meetings. The board is currently chaired by Marek Townley.

Patron and Founder 
Aaron Hape founded Commonwealth Youth New Zealand in 2014 and served as the inaugural executive director (now Executive Committee Chair) until 2017.

In 2017, Sir Anand Satyanand was appointed Commonwealth Youth New Zealand's patron. Satyanand is a former judge and Governor-General of New Zealand. Following his tenure as Governor-General he was appointed as chair of the Commonwealth Foundation.

Leadership

References 

Youth rights organizations